Ludo Loos (13 January 1955 – 1 March 2019) was a Belgian professional road bicycle racer.

Career 
During the 1980 Tour de France Loos was able to escape in a solo breakaway during Stage 18, which was a major mountain stage. He was the first rider over all five climbs and won the stage finishing 5:19 ahead of the group of favorites which included his teammate Lucien Van Impe, Robert Alban, Joaquim Agostinho and eventual yellow jersey winner Joop Zoetemelk. Loos would finish eighteenth in that year's general classification and second in the mountains classification.

In the 1985 Vuelta a España, Loos collided with a dog, and broke a neck vertebra. This effectively ended his career as cyclist.

On 1 March 2019, Loos died following a long illness.

Major results

1980
Tour de France:
Winner stage 18

References

External links 

Official Tour de France results for Ludo Loos

1955 births
2019 deaths
Belgian male cyclists
Belgian Tour de France stage winners
People from Essen, Belgium
Cyclists from Antwerp Province